is a city located in the western portion of Tokyo, Japan. , the city had an estimated population of 131,895 in 63,917 households, and a population density of 1300 persons per km2.

Geography
Ōme is located in the Okutama Mountains of western Tokyo, bordered by Saitama Prefecture to the north. The Tama River runs from west to east almost in the center of the city area, and the Kasumi River and Naruki River, which are tributaries of the Iruma River (Arakawa River system), also flow from west to east in the north. The geography changes from the flat land in the east to the hills and mountains in the west. The highest point is 1,084 meters on Mount Nabewariyama on the right bank of the Tama River in the western end of the city.

Surrounding municipalities
Tokyo Metropolis
 Hinode to the south
Hamura to the southeast
Okutama to the west
Akiruno to the south
Saitama Prefecture
Hanno to the north
Iruma to the east

Climate
Ōme has a Humid subtropical climate (Köppen Cfa) characterized by warm summers and cool winters with light to no snowfall. The average annual temperature in Ōme is 12.3 °C. The average annual rainfall is 1998 mm with September as the wettest month. The temperatures are highest on average in August, at around 23.8 °C, and lowest in January, at around 0.7 °C.

Demographics
Per Japanese census data, the population of Ōme increased rapidly in the 1970s and 1980s.

History
The area of present-day Ōme was part of ancient Musashi Province. Ōme developed in the Edo period as a post station on the Ōme Kaidō highway. In the post-Meiji Restoration cadastral reform of July 22, 1878, the area became part of Nishitama District in Kanagawa Prefecture. The town of Ōme was created on April 1, 1889, with the establishment of modern municipalities system. Nishitama District was transferred to the administrative control of Tokyo Metropolis on April 1, 1893. Ōme was elevated to city status on April 1, 1951, by merging with the neighboring villages of Kasumi and Chōfu. Later in 1955, four additional villages (Yoshida, Mita, Kosoki, and Nariki) merged with Ōme.

Government
Ōme has a mayor-council form of government with a directly elected mayor and a unicameral city council of 24 members. Ōme contributes one member to the Tokyo Metropolitan Assembly. In terms of national politics, the city is part of Tokyo 25th district of the lower house of the Diet of Japan.

Education
Meisei University - Ōme campus

The city has two public high schools operated by the Tokyo Metropolitan Board of Education. Tokyo Metropolis also operates one special education school for then handicapped.

Ōme has 17 public elementary schools and 11 public junior high schools operated by the city government.

Municipal junior high schools:
 No. 1 (第一中学校)
 No. 2 (第二中学校)
 No. 3 (第三中学校)
 No. 6 (第六中学校)
 No. 7 (第七中学校)
 Fukiage (吹上中学校)
 Higashi (東中学校)
 Izumi (泉中学校)
 Kasumidai (霞台中学校)
 Nishi (西中学校)
 Shinmachi (新町中学校)

Municipal elementary schools:
 No. 1 (第一小学校)
 No. 2 (第二小学校)
 No. 3 (第三小学校)
 No. 4 (第四小学校)
 No. 5 (第五小学校)
 No. 6 (第六小学校)
 No. 7 (第七小学校)
 Fujihashi (藤橋小学校)
 Fukiage (吹上小学校)
 Higashi ("East") (東小学校)
 Imai (今井小学校)
 Kabe (河辺小学校)
 Kasumidai (霞台小学校)
 Nariki (成木小学校)
 Shinmachi (新町小学校)
 Tomoda (友田小学校)
 Wakakusa (若草小学校)

Transportation

Railway
 JR East – Ōme Line 
  -  -  -  -  -  -  -  -  - 
Mitake Tozan Railway

Highway

Sister city relations
 - Boppard, Germany

Local attractions
 Ome Railway Park
 Ome Marathon
Mount Mitake
Mitake Shrine

References

External links

Ōme City Official Website 
 Ōme Tourist Information

 
Cities in Tokyo
Western Tokyo